Sufala (Arabic: سفالة، Sfala) is a village in Sitra, Bahrain, located in the eastern coast of the island.

References

Sitra

Populated places in Bahrain